Dariusz Wrzosek (born 1982) is a Polish slalom canoeist who competed at the international level from 1997 to 2008.

He won a bronze medal in the C2 team event at the 2002 ICF Canoe Slalom World Championships in Bourg St.-Maurice alongside Bartłomiej Kruczek. He also won a silver and a bronze in the same event at the European Championships alongside Jarosław Miczek.

External links

Living people
Polish male canoeists
1982 births
Place of birth missing (living people)
Medalists at the ICF Canoe Slalom World Championships